Locrian Greek is an ancient Greek dialect that was spoken by the Locrians in Locris, Central Greece. It is a dialect of Northwest Greek. The Locrians were divided into two tribes, the Ozolian Locrians and the Opuntian Locrians, thus the Locrian dialect can be also divided in two branches, the Ozolian and Opuntian respectively. The traits of both dialects were described by Wilhelm Dittenberger, editor of the project Inscriptiones Graecae.

Ozolian Locrian
Dative plural of the third declension in -οις (-ois) instead of -σι (-si), a Northwest trait, e.g. πάντοις pantois —  pasi, μειόνοις meionois — μείοσι meiosi
The adjective διπλειός dipleios instead of  diplous
The assimilation of κ (k) in the preposition  ek with the first consonant of the next word, e.g.  λιμένος e(l) limenos —  λιμένος ek limenos
The preposition κατά (kata) governs the genitive rather than the accusative, e.g.  kath'ōn —  kath'a

Opuntian Locrian
Dative plural of the third declension in -εσσι (-essi) instead of -οις (-ois), an Aeolic trait which was found in the Phocian dialect too, e.g. Κεφαλλάνεσσι Kephallanessi, χρημάτεσσι chrêmatessi
The infinitive in -εν (-en) instead of -ειν (-ein), e.g.  anagraphen —  anagraphein
The patronymic names are according to the name they define, an Aeolic trait, e.g. Δαναΐς Νικοτελεία Danais Nikoteleia — Δαναΐς Νικοτέλους Danais Nikotelous
The preposition κατά (kata) governs the genitive rather than the accusative, e.g.  kath'ōn —  kath'a

Glossary
 deilomai will, want (Locrian and Delphian) (Attic boulomai) (Coan  dêlomai) (Doric bôlomai) (Thessalian bellomai)
 Werrô go away (Attic errô) (Hsch. berrês fugitive, berreuô escape)
 Wesparioi Lokroi  Epizephyrian (Western) Locrians in Calabria (Attic hesperios of the evening, western, Doric wesperios) (cf. Latin Vesper) IG IX,1² 3:718
 Lokroi toi hypoknamidioi (Attic Lokroi hoi hypoknemidioi) Hypoknemidian Locrians; under mount Knemis IG IX,1² 3:718
 opliai places where the Locrians counted their cattle

See also
Doric Greek

References

External links
Fr. Bechtel. Die griechishe Dialekte, II. Berlin, 1923.

Doric Greek
Locrians